Fredlanea hiekei is a species of beetle in the family Cerambycidae. It was described by Ernst Fuchs in 1970, originally under the genus Adesmus. It is known from Ecuador and Colombia.

References

Hemilophini
Beetles described in 1970